The Shareware Industry Awards were a series of awards issued annually by the Shareware Industry Awards Foundation during the Software Industry Conference.

Origin of the Shareware Industry Award
The Software Industry Conference website notes: "The Shareware Industry Awards were conceived by Michael Callahan aka Dr. File Finder at the time of the first shareware conference – as a means to focus attention on the shareware industry. Michael felt that while the conference would help shareware authors in general, an awards ceremony "like the Academy Awards" would benefit the shareware industry as a whole. In 2010, Callahan pleaded guilty to embezzling $167,000 from the Shareware Industry Awards Foundation. He was given a 10-year suspended sentence and ordered to pay restitution.

See also

 List of computer-related awards

References

External links
 
 Software Industry Conference

Computer-related awards